Caladenia gemmata, commonly known as the blue china orchid, is a plant in the orchid family Orchidaceae and is endemic to the south-west of Western Australia. It has a small, oval leaf and up to three intense blue to mauve flowers. It is the most common and widespread of the West Australian china orchids, sometimes appearing in large numbers after summer fires.

Description
Caladenia gemmata is a terrestrial, perennial, deciduous, herb with an underground tuber. The lateral sepals and petals have about the same dimensions as the dorsal sepal. There are many scattered small, bead-like calli covering the labellum. Flowering occurs from August to early November.

Taxonomy and naming
Caladenia gemmata was first formally described in 1840 by John Lindley and the description was published in A Sketch of the Vegetation of the Swan River Colony.  In 2000, Stephen Hopper and Andrew Brown changed the name to Cyanicula gemmata, but in 2015, as a result of studies of molecular phylogenetics Mark Clements changed the name back to Caladenia fragrans. The specific epithet (gemmata) is a Latin word meaning "with buds, eyes or jewels" referring to the labellum calli.

Distribution and habitat
The blue china orchid is a common and widespread china orchid found between Kalbarri in the north and Israelite Bay in the east, growing in a range of habitats from heath to forest. Plants growing in wetter areas tend to flower more profusely after summer fires.

Conservation
Caladenia gemmata is classified as "not threatened" by the Western Australian Government Department of Parks and Wildlife.

References

gemmata
Endemic orchids of Australia
Orchids of Western Australia
Plants described in 2000
Endemic flora of Western Australia